Saltara is a frazione of the comune of Colli al Metauro in the province of Pesaro e Urbino, Marche, central Italy. It is on a  hill overlooking the lower Metauro valley. It was a separate comune until 1 January 2017.

Before World War II Saltara was a center of pallone col bracciale playing.

Main sights
Remains of the medieval castle
Former church of Fonte (1595)
Sanctuary of Madonna della Villa
Convent of San Francesco di Rovereto
Science Museum of Villa del Balì

References

Cities and towns in the Marche